Odontoglossum, first named in 1816 by Karl Sigismund Kunth, is a genus of about 100 orchids. The scientific name is derived from the Greek words odon (tooth) and glossa (tongue), referring to the two tooth-like calluses on the base of the lip. This genus of cool to cold growing orchids is to be found on open spots in the humid cloud forest at higher elevations from Central- and West South America to Guyana, with most species around the northern Andes. The abbreviation for this genus is Odm. in the horticultural trade.

Most are sympodial epiphytes, or rarely terrestrials.

The pseudobulbs are compact with leaf-like bracts at the base. They give one to three apical leaves. An arching (and sometimes erect) inflorescence grows from its base. The ruffled sepals and petals of these spectacular flowers are spreading. The lip is rather complex, entire or with three lobes. It stands erect or parallel to the long column. The high altitude species show long inflorescences with up to 150 flowers (as in O. cirrhosum), while the lower altitude species have shorter inflorescences with up to 20 flowers. These flowers may be white, red, purple, brown, yellow, or even be blotched with a showy blend of many colors.

Many of these species are in great demand with orchid lovers because of their spectacular and flamboyant flowers.

Species 
This genus used to contain more than 400 species. Many have now been reclassified in other genera such as Amparoa, Aspasia, Cochlioda, Cuitlauzina, Cyrtochilum, Gomesa, Lemboglossum, Mesoglossum, Miltonia, Miltonioides, Oliveriana, Oncidium, Osmoglossum, Otoglossum, Rhynchostele, Rossioglossum and Ticoglossum. This new genera occurred outside the Andes in different climatological habitats.

There is some debate going on whether Odontoglossum is a separate genus or if most or even all species should be included in Oncidium. If the latter opinion is followed (see Genera Orchidacearum by Alec M. Pridgeon, Phillip J. Cribb, Mark W. Chase, and Finn N. Rasmussen) most species in the list below are actually called Oncidiums. 

The following list gives the presently accepted names. There are six subgenera : Erectolobata, Lindleyana, Nevadensia, Odontoglossum, Serratolaminata and Unguisepala.
 Odontoglossum alberti P.Ortiz 2005 (Colombia)
 Odontoglossum alvarezii P.Ortiz 2001 (Colombia)
 Odontoglossum ariasii Dalström 2001 (Peru)
 Odontoglossum armatum Rchb.f. 1876 : Armed Odontoglossum (Ecuador)
 Odontoglossum aspidorhinum F.Lehm. 1895 :  Shield-leather Odontoglossum (Colombia to Ecuador)
 Odontoglossum astranthum Linden & Rchb.f. 1867 (Ecuador to Peru)
 Odontoglossum aurarium (Rchb.f.) Garay, 1970 (Bolivia)
 Odontoglossum auriculatum Rolfe 1892 (Colombia)
 Odontoglossum blandum Rchb.f. 1870 : Charming Odontoglossum (Ecuador to Peru)
 Odontoglossum boddaertianum Rchb.f. 1888 (Venezuela)
 Odontoglossum callacallaense D.E.Benn. & Christenson 2001 (Peru)
 Odontoglossum cirrhosum Lindl. 1833 : Wavy Odontoglossum (Colombia to Ecuador)(sometimes terrestrial)
 Odontoglossum constrictum Lindl. 1843 : Constricted Odontoglossum (Venezuela)
 Odontoglossum contaypacchaense D.E.Benn. & Christenson, 2001 (Peru)
 Odontoglossum crinitum Rchb.f. 1874 : Hairy Odontoglossum (Colombia to Ecuador)
 Odontoglossum crispum Lindl. 1845 : Curled Odontoglossum (Colombia)
 Odontoglossum cristatellum Rchb.f. 1878 (Colombia to Ecuador)
 Odontoglossum cristatellum subsp. cristatellum (Colombia to Ecuador) 
 Odontoglossum cristatellum subsp. lehmannii Rchb.f. Bockemühl 1989 (Colombia to Ecuador)
 Odontoglossum cristatum Lindl. in G.Bentham 1845 :  Comb-Like Odontoglossum (Ecuador to Peru) (occasionally terrestrial) 
 Odontoglossum crocidipterum Rchb.f., 1871 : Saffron-yellow Two-winged Odontoglossum (Colombia to Venezuela)
 Odontoglossum crocidipterum subsp. crocidipterum (Colombia)
 Odontoglossum crocidipterum subsp. dormanianum (Rchb.f.) Bockemühl 1989 (Venezuela)
 Odontoglossum cruentum Rchb.f., 1873 : Blood-red Odontoglossum (Ecuador to Peru)
 Odontoglossum depauperatum Kraenzl. 1906 (Peru)
 Odontoglossum digitatum C.Schweinf. 1945 : Fingered Odontoglossum (Peru)
 Odontoglossum dormanianum Rchb.f., 1884 (Colombia to Venezuela)
 Odontoglossum dracoceps Dalström 1999 (Bolivia)
 Odontoglossum epidendroides Kunth in F.W.H.von Humboldt, A.J.A.Bonpland & C.S.Kunth 1816 : Epidendrum-like Odontoglossum (Ecuador to Peru)
 Odontoglossum gloriosum Linden & Rchb.f. 1854 : Glorious Odontoglossum (Colombia)
 Odontoglossum gramazuense D.E.Benn. & Christenson, 2001 (Peru)
 Odontoglossum hallii Lindl. 1837 :  Hall's Odontoglossum (Colombia to Ecuador) (occasionally terrestrial)
 Odontoglossum harryanum Rchb.f., 1886 :  Harry's Odontoglossum (Ecuador to Peru) (after Harry Veitch)
 Odontoglossum hauensteinii Königer 1994 (Bolivia)
 Odontoglossum helgae Königer 1997 (Ecuador)
 Odontoglossum heterosepalum (Rchb.f.) Garay, 1978 (Venezuela)
 Odontoglossum hrubyanum Rchb.f. 1888 (Peru)
 Odontoglossum juninense Schltr. 1921 : Junin Odontoglossum (Ecuador to Peru)
 Odontoglossum kegeljani E.Morren, 1877 :  Kegel's Odontoglossum (Ecuador to Peru)
 Odontoglossum krameri Rchb.f. 1868 (Nicaragua, Costa Rica, Panama) 
 Odontoglossum lindleyanum Rchb.f. & Warsz. 1854 :  Lindley's Odontoglossum (Venezuela to Ecuador)
 Odontoglossum llanachagaense D.E.Benn. & Christenson 2001 (Peru)
 Odontoglossum lucianum Rchb.f. 1886 :  Lucien's Odontoglossum (Venezuela)
 Odontoglossum luteopurpureum Lindl. 1846 (Colombia)
 Odontoglossum machupicchuense D.E.Benn. & Christenson 2001 (Peru)
 Odontoglossum mapiriense Mansf. 1934 (Bolivia)
 Odontoglossum micklowii Dalström 1993 (Bolivia)
 Odontoglossum mirandum Rchb.f. 1882 : Grand Odontoglossum (Colombia to Ecuador)  
 Odontoglossum multistellare Rchb.f. 1876 : Many-starred Odontoglossum (Peru)
 Odontoglossum naevium Lindl. 1850 : Spotted Odontoglossum (Colombia to Guyana)
 Odontoglossum nevadense Rchb.f. 1870 : The High Mountain Odontoglossum (Colombia to Venezuela)
 Odontoglossum nobile Rchb.f. 1850 : Grand Odontoglossum (Colombia)
 Odontoglossum odoratum Lindl., 1846 : Fragrant Odontoglossum (Colombia to Venezuela)
 Odontoglossum platynaris Dalström 2001 (Peru)
 Odontoglossum portillae Bockemühl 1985 (Ecuador)
 Odontoglossum portmannii Bockemühl, 1988 (Colombia, Ecuador, Peru)
 Odontoglossum portmannii subsp. cohrsiae Bockemühl 1988 (Colombia)
 Odontoglossum portmannii subsp. portmannii (Ecuador to Peru)
 Odontoglossum povedanum P.Ortiz 1997 (Colombia)
 Odontoglossum praenitens Rchb.f. 1875 (Colombia)
 Odontoglossum praestans Rchb.f. & Warsz., 1854 (Colombia, Ecuador, Peru)
 Odontoglossum pseudomelanthes D.E.Benn. & Christenson, 2001 (Peru)
 Odontoglossum reversum Bockemühl 1986 (Colombia to Ecuador)
 Odontoglossum rhynchanthum Rchb.f. 1887 : Beak-flowered Odontoglossum (Colombia)
 Odontoglossum rubrocallosum D.E.Benn. & Christenson, 2001 (Peru)
 Odontoglossum sanderianum Rchb.f., 1881 (Colombia to Venezuela)
 Odontoglossum sceptrum Rchb.f. & Warsz. 1854 (Colombia)
 Odontoglossum sceptrum var. facetum (Rchb.f.) Bockemühl, 1989 (Colombia)
 Odontoglossum sceptrum var. sceptrum (Colombia)
 Odontoglossum schillerianum Rchb.f. 1854 (Venezuela)
 Odontoglossum spectatissimum Lindl. 1852 (Venezuela to Ecuador)
 Odontoglossum subuligerum Rchb.f. 1876 (Peru)
 Odontoglossum tenue Cogn. 1895 : Delicate Odontoglossum (Ecuador to Peru)
 Odontoglossum tenuifolium Dalström 1996 : Delicate-leafed Odontoglossum(Bolivia)
 Odontoglossum tripudians Rchb.f. & Warsz. 1854 (Colombia) (occasionally terrestrial)
 Odontoglossum velleum Rchb.f., 1874 (Ecuador to Peru)
 Odontoglossum vierlingii Senghas 2000 (Bolivia)
 Odontoglossum wallisii Linden & Rchb.f., 1870 (Colombia to Venezuela)
 Odontoglossum wyattianum Gurney Wilson 1928 :  Wyatt's Odontoglossum (Peru)

Natural hybrids 

 Odontoglossum × acuminatissimum Rchb.f. 1882 (O. cristatum × O. lindleyanum) (Colombia)
 Odontoglossum × adrianae L.Linden 1879 (O. nobile × O. luteopurpureum) (Colombia)
 Odontoglossum × andersonianum Rchb.f. 1868 (O. crispum × O. gloriosum) (Colombia to Venezuela)
 Odontoglossum × brandtii Kraenzl. & Wittm., G 1889 (O. cirrhosum × O. nobile) (Colombia)
 Odontoglossum × cookianum Rolfe, 1891 (O. sanderianum × O. spectatissimum) (Colombia)
 Odontoglossum × coradinei Rchb.f. 1872 (O. crispum × O. lindleyanum) (Colombia)
 Odontoglossum × dicranophorum Rchb.f., 1888 (O. lindleyanum × O. spectatissimum) (Colombia)
 Odontoglossum × elegans Rchb.f. 1879 (O. cirrhosum × O. cristatum) (Ecuador)
 Odontoglossum × excellens Rchb.f. 1881 (O. nobile × O. spectatissimum) (Colombia)
 Odontoglossum × godseffianum Rolfe, 1894 (O. auriculatum × O. spectatissimum) (Colombia)
 Odontoglossum × hennisii Rolfe, 1894 (O. kegeljani × O. tenue) (Peru)
 Odontoglossum × hinnus Rchb.f., 1870 (O. hallii × O. cirrhosum) (Ecuador)
 Odontoglossum × kraenzlinii O'Brien, 1893 (O. naevium × O. schillerianum) (Colombia)
 Odontoglossum × leeanum Rchb.f. 1882 (O. crocodipterum × O. schillerianum) (Colombia)
 Odontoglossum × limbatum Rchb.f. 1870 (O. nobile × O. lindleyanum) (Colombia)
 Odontoglossum × marriottianum Rchb.f. 1881 (O. crispum × O. hallii) (Colombia)
 Odontoglossum × mulus Rchb.f., 1870 (O. luteopurpureum × O. gloriosum) (Colombia)
 Odontoglossum × murrellianum Rchb.f. 1875 (O. naevium × O. nobile) (Colombia)
 Odontoglossum × schroederianum Rchb.f. 1882 (O. nobile × O. tripudians) (Colombia)
 Odontoglossum × stellimicans Rchb.f. 1884 (O. lindleyanum × O. tripudians) (Colombia)
 Odontoglossum × wilckeanum Rchb.f. 1880 (O. crispum × O. luteopurpureum) (Colombia to Venezuela)

Intergeneric hybrids 

Odontoglossum lends itself to the production of many artificial intergeneric hybrids. The hybrids with red pigmentation are nearly all derived from a crossing with the genus Cochlioda and especially with Cochlioda noezliana. 

If the merge of Odontoglossum into Oncidium is followed, most of following nothogenus names are obsolete : 

 xAdaglossum : Ada  x Odontoglossum
 xAlexanderara : Brassia  x Cochlioda  x Odontoglossum  x Oncidium
 xAndreettara J.M.H.Shaw : Cochlioda x Miltonia x Odontoglossum
 xAspodonia : Aspasia  x Miltonia  x Odontoglossum
 xBakerara : Brassia  x Miltonia  x Odontoglossum  x Oncidium
 xBaldwinara :  Aspasia  x Cochlioda  x Odontoglossum  x Oncidium
 xBanfieldara : Ada  x Brassia  x Odontoglossum
 xBarbosaara : Cochlioda  x Gomesa  x Odontoglossum  x Oncidium
 xBaumannara : Comparettia  x Odontoglossum  x Oncidium
 xBeallara : Brassia  x Cochlioda  x Miltonia  x Odontoglossum
 xBiltonara : Ada  x Cochlioda  x Miltonia  x Odontoglossum
 xBlackara : Aspasia  x Cochlioda  x Miltonia x Odontoglossum
 xBrassia R. Br. 1813 Cochlioda Lindl. 1853 × Miltonia Lindl. 1837 × Odontoglossum Kunth 1816 
 xBrillandeara : Aspasia  x Brassia  x Cochlioda  x Miltonia  x Odontoglossum  x Oncidium
 xBrummittara : Comparettia  x Odontoglossum  x Rodriguezia
 xBurkhardtara : Leochilus  x Odontoglossum  x Oncidium  x Rodriguezia
 xBurrageara : Cochlioda  x Miltonia  x Odontoglossum  x Oncidium
 xCambria : Brassia x Cochlioda  x Miltonia x Oncidium x Odontoglossum 
 xCampbellara : Odontoglossum  x Oncidium  x Rodriguezia
 xCarpenterara : Baptistonia  x Odontoglossum  x Oncidium
 xColmanara : Miltonia  x Odontoglossum  x Oncidium
 xDegarmoara : Brassia  x Miltonia  x Odontoglossum
 xDerosaara : Odontoglossum  x Miltonia  x Aspasia  x Brassia
 xDoncollinara : Cochlioda  x Odontoglossum  x Rodriguezia
 xGomoglossum : Gomesa  x Odontoglossum
 xGoodaleara : Brassia  x Cochlioda  x Miltonia  x Odontoglossum  x Oncidium
 xHamiltonara : Ada  x Brassia  x Cochlioda  x Odontoglossum
 xKriegerara : Ada  x Cochlioda  x Odontoglossum  x Oncidium
 xLagerara : Aspasia  x Cochlioda  x Odontoglossum
 xMaclellanara : Brassia x Odontoglossum x Oncidium
 xMaunderara : Ada  x Cochlioda  x Miltonia  x Odontoglossum  x Oncidium
 xMiltodontrum J.M.H.Shaw 2004 : (Miltonia Lindl. x Odontoglossum Kunth x Trichocentrum Poepp. & Endl.).
 xMorrisonara : Ada  x Odontoglossum  x Miltonia
 xOdontioda  : Odontoglossum x Cochlioda
 xOdontobrassia : Brassia  x Odontoglossum
 xOdontocentrum J.M.H.Shaw  2004 : (Odontoglossum Kunth x Trichocentrum Poepp. & Endl.).
 xOdontocidium :  Odontoglossum x Oncidium
 xOdontokoa J.M.H.Shaw 2004 : (Odontoglossum Kunth x Zelenkoa M.W.Chase & N.H.Williams).
 xOdontonia : Miltonia x Odontoglossum
 xOdontopilia : Odontoglossum  x Trichopilia
 xOdontorettia : Comparettia  x Odontoglossum
 xOdontozelencidium J.M.H.Shaw 2004 : (Odontoglossum Kunth x Oncidium Sw. x Zelenkoa M.W.Chase & N.H.Williams).
 xRhyntonossum J.M.H.Shaw 2004 : (Miltonia Lindl. x Odontoglossum Kunth x Rhynchostele Rchb.f.).
 xRichardsonara : Aspasia  x Odontoglossum  x Oncidium
 xRoccaforteara : Odontoglossum  x Aspasia  x Brassia  x Cochlioda
 xRodriglossum : Odontoglossum  x Rodriguezia
 xRuppara : Gomesa x Odontoglossum x Oncidium
 xSanderara : Brassia  x Cochlioda  x Odontoglossum
 xSchafferara : Aspasia  x Brassia  x Cochlioda  x Miltonia  x Odontoglossum
 xSegerara : Aspasia  x Cochlioda  x Miltonia  x Oncidium  x Odontoglossum
 xShiveara : Aspasia  x Brassia  x Odontoglossum  x Oncidium
 xStewartara : Ada  x Cochlioda  x Odontoglossum
 xVanalstyneara : Miltonia  x Odontoglossum  x Oncidium  x Rodriguezia
 xVuylstekeara : Cochlioda x Miltonia x Odontoglossum
 xWatsonara J.M.H.Shaw  2004 : (Brassia R.Br. x Odontoglossum Kunth x Oncidium Sw. x Trichocentrum Poepp. & Endl.)
 xWilsonara : Cochlioda x Odontoglossum x Oncidium
 xWingfieldara : Aspasia  x Brassia  x Odontoglossum
 xWithnerara : Aspasia  x Miltonia  x Odontoglossum  x Oncidium

References 

 
Oncidiinae genera
Epiphytic orchids